Im Ye-jin (born Im Ki-hee on January 24, 1960) is a South Korean actress. As a teenage actress, she reached the peak of her popularity in the 1970s with the "Really Really" film trilogy, which include Never Forget Me, I Am Really Sorry and I Really Really Like You. She is currently active in television.

Career
Im Ki-hee began modeling in popular teen magazines when she was in junior high school. Using the stage name Im Ye-jin, she made her acting debut in Kim Ki-young's Transgression in 1974.

In 1975, Im played a high schooler in love with her teacher in Graduating School Girls, for which she won Best New Actress at the Grand Bell Awards. But it was a year later when she would be catapulted to stardom. Im headlined Never Forget Me (also known as Really Really Don't Forget, 1976) and its sequels I Am Really Sorry (also known as I'm Really Really Sorry, 1976) and Crazy For You (also known as I Really Really Like You, 1977) -- movies about teenage friendship, romance, and aspirations that became massive box office hits, screening to sold out theaters. In an era when Korean cinema was in a dark period resulting from severe censorship by an authoritarian government, this led to the emergence of the teenage demographic as a major consumer of pop culture. Im had an innocent, girlish image, whose acting was charming and sweet without being saccharine, and she became hugely popular among middle school and high school students; girls wanted to be like her, and boys had her picture in their pockets. The "Really Really" series established Im as the most popular young actress of that period, and for the next several years, youth melodramas starring her dominated the theaters in quick succession, often with Lee Deok-hwa as her leading man: Prayer of a Girl (1976), Ever So Much Good! (1976), I Really Have a Dream (1976), I've Never Felt Like This Before (1976), and Nobody Knows (1977).

Im entered college in 1979, studying Theater and Film at Dongguk University. By this time, she wanted to transition out of teen movies, and into more adult roles. She starred opposite Shin Seong-il in Love Song in a Peanut Shell, but it was poorly received, with audiences not prepared to see her break out of her "pure" image. Despite a supporting role in A Fine, Windy Day, Im's film career was in a slump, so she shifted her focus to television and radio in the 1980s.

After a few years of forgettable television dramas, Im's career was revitalized by Kim Soo-hyun, one of the most famous TV writers in Korea. Among Kim's dramas that Im starred in were 사랑합시다 (1981), Yesterday and Tomorrow (1982), Love and Truth (1984), Love and Ambition (1987), Farewell (1994), and Childless Comfort (2012). In Farewell, she shocked audiences by playing a Fatal Attraction-esque villain for the first time. Im also played the character Dal-soo in a series of one-act dramas for MBC Best Theater from 1995 to 2005.

As Im grew older, she remained active on television and the occasional film, in supporting roles as ajummas, aunts or mothers. As if coming full circle, she played one of the adult characters in a 2010 musical theatre adaptation of her early hit I Really Really Like You.

From 2008 to 2010, Im was a popular panelist on the variety show Quiz to Change the World, for which she was recognized at the MBC Entertainment Awards.

In 2014, Im signed with the talent agency YG Entertainment. In December 2019, it was confirmed that her contract with YG Entertainment has expired and decided not to renew.

Personal life
In 1989, Im married Choi Chang-wook, a TV director and producer at MBC.

Filmography

Film

Trade Your Love (2019)
Secret Love (2010)
My Mighty Princess (2008)
Miss Gold Digger (2007)
Dasepo Naughty Girls (2006)
Ssunday Seoul (2006)
Windstruck (2004)
The Classic (2003)
Crack of the Halo (1998)
Love's Scribble (1988)
A Fine, Windy Day (1980) 
Love Song in a Peanut Shell (1979)
The Hey Days of Youth 77 (1979)
Cheerful High School Class (1978)
Fire (1978)
Nobody Knows (1977)
Our World (1977)
I Really Really Like You (1977)
The Double Rainbow Hill (1977)
Goodbye, Sir! (1977)
The First Snow (1977)
When We Grow Up... (1977)
Angry Apple (1977) 
I've Never Felt Like This Before (1976) 
I'm Really Really Sorry (1976)
Blue Classroom (1976)
I Really Have a Dream (1976)
Ever So Much Good! (1976) 
Prayer of a Girl (1976)
Really Really Don't Forget (1976)
Graduating School Girls (1975)
Red Shoes (1975)
Transgression (1974)

Television series

 Young Lady and Gentleman (KBS2, 2021)
 Lie After Lie (Channel A, 2020)
My Only One (KBS2, 2018) 
A Korean Odyssey (tvN / 2017-2018) - Bangmooljangsoo (peddler)
Hit the Top (KBS2, 2017)
The Liar and His Lover (tvN, 2017)
 (SBS, 2016)
Splash Splash Love (MBC, 2015)
The Producers (KBS2, 2015)
Rosy Lovers (MBC, 2014)
Marriage, Not Dating (tvN, 2014)
Can We Fall in Love, Again? (jTBC, 2014)
Miss Korea (MBC, 2013)
Princess Aurora (MBC, 2013) 
7th Grade Civil Servant (MBC, 2013) 
Childless Comfort (jTBC, 2012)
Immortal Classic (Channel A, 2012)
Iron Daughters-in-Law (MBC, 2011)
Romance Town (KBS2, 2011)
Sweet Palpitations (KBS2, 2011)
My Princess (MBC, 2011)
Smile, Mom (SBS, 2010)
You Don't Know Women (SBS, 2010)
Life Is Beautiful (SBS, 2010) (cameo)
Life Is Good (MBC, 2009)
Queen Seondeok (MBC, 2009)
The Road Home (KBS1, 2009)
Boys over Flowers (KBS2, 2009)
Little Mom Scandal - Season 2 (CGV, 2008)
Lawyers of the Great Republic of Korea (MBC, 2008)
Little Mom Scandal (CGV, 2008)
Winter Bird (MBC, 2007)
MBC Best Theater "동네 한바퀴" (MBC, 2006)
Which Star Are You From (MBC, 2006)
Princess Hours (MBC, 2006)
MBC Best Theater "달수, 성매매특별법에 걸리다" (MBC, 2005)
Love and Sympathy (SBS, 2005)
MBC Best Theater "달수, 아들 과외하다" (MBC, 2004)
Ireland (MBC, 2004)
Full House (KBS2, 2004)
People of the Water Flower Village (MBC, 2004)
MBC Best Theater "Do 야 love me?" (MBC, 2003)
MBC Best Theater "달려라 장 부장" (MBC, 2002)
Honest Living (SBS, 2002)
Affection (SBS, 2002)
Wonderful Days (SBS, 2001)
Blue Mist (KBS2, 2001)
LA Arirang (SBS, 2000)
MBC Best Theater "달수, 부메랑을 맞다" (MBC, 1999)
Crush (KBS2, 1998)
See and See Again (MBC, 1998)
사랑한다는 것은 (EBS, 1998)
MBC Best Theater "달수의 홀로 아리랑" (MBC, 1997)
MBC Best Theater "달수, 효도법 어기다" (MBC, 1997)
OK Ranch (SBS, 1997)
MBC Best Theater "황금빛 정원" (MBC, 1996)
MBC Best Theater "달수의 차, 차, 차" (MBC, 1996)
MBC Best Theater "달수 아들 학교 가다" (MBC, 1996)
Three Kingdoms (KBS2, 1996)
MBC Best Theater "달수의 집짓기" (MBC, 1995)
MBC Best Theater "달수의 재판" (MBC, 1995)
Love and Marriage (MBC, 1995)
Partner (MBC, 1994-1997)
Farewell (SBS, 1994)
Mountain Wind (MBC, 1993)
Professor Oh's Family (SBS, 1993)
Mozart the Janitor (KBS1, 1992) 
A Rainy Afternoon (KBS2, 1991)
Ancient Geum Jan-di (KBS1, 1991)
Freezing Point (KBS2, 1990)
꼴찌 수색대 (MBC, 1990)
Sunrise (KBS2, 1989)
Legacy (MBC, 1989)
또래와 뚜리 (MBC, 1988)
Love and Ambition (MBC, 1987)
First Love (MBC, 1986)
Love and Truth (MBC, 1984)
Sunflower in Winter (MBC, 1983)
Friend, My Friend (MBC, 1982)
Yesterday and Tomorrow (MBC, 1982)
사랑합시다 (MBC, 1981)
Han River (MBC, 1981)
Anguk-dong Madam (MBC, 1980)
White Dandelion (MBC, 1979)
Frugal Family (MBC, 1979)
X 수색대 (MBC, 1978)
South Wind (MBC, 1978)
봄처녀 오셨네 (MBC, 1977)
Third Class (MBC, 1977)
귀로 (MBC, 1975)
Jade Flute (TBC, 1975)

Variety show
Sunday Sunday Night Parody Theater "Temptation of the Legacy of the Queen of Housewives" (MBC, 2009)
Quiz to Change the World (MBC, 2008-2010) - panelist
Oasis (SBS, 2008) - MC
Truth Game (SBS, 2005-2007) - panelist
Vitamin (KBS2, 2006-2007) - panelist
Lee Jae-yong and Im Ye-jin's Good Day (MBC, 2006-2007) - MC
My Mom's the Best (GTV, 1995) - MC
영11 (MBC, 1981-1982) - MC
MBC Campus Song Festival (1978, 1979, 1981) - MC
King of Mask Singer (MBC, 2017) – Contestant as "The Goal Is Marriage Report Juliet" (episode 99)

Music video
T-ara - "Roly-Poly" (2011) 
Joo Hyun-mi and Seohyun - "Jjarajajja" (2009)
Psy feat. Snoop Dogg - "Hangover" (2014)

Theater
I Really Really Like You (2010)

Radio program
Hopeful Music at Noon (MBC Radio, 1980-1984)
Song Chang-ho and Im Ye-jin's Ode to Youth (MBC Radio, 1980-1981)
The Lee Deok-hwa and Im Ye-jin Show (TBC Radio, 1978-1979)

Awards
2009 MBC Entertainment Awards: Female Excellence Award in Variety (Quiz to Change the World) 
2008 MBC Entertainment Awards: Best Entertainer Award (Quiz to Change the World)
2007 MBC Drama Awards: Best TV Host (Good Day)
1975 Grand Bell Awards: Best New Actress (Graduating School Girls)

References

External links
 
 
 

Actresses from Seoul
20th-century South Korean actresses
21st-century South Korean actresses
South Korean film actresses
South Korean television actresses
Dongguk University alumni
Living people
1959 births